Jeff Fultz (December 14, 1968) is an American professional stock car racing driver and team owner. He is a multiple time champion of the now defunct NASCAR Southeast Series having won it three times (2002, 2004, 2005), and has the most wins in the category with 26. He has also raced in the NASCAR Busch Series and the ARCA Racing Series.

Racing career
Fultz first raced in the NASCAR Southeast Series in 1996, driving in fourteen of the twenty-three races on the schedule with a win at Caraway Speedway in Asheboro, North Carolina, and finished 17th in points. For next year, he would run the full schedule and finish second in the point standings behind Hal Goodson, with one win at St. Augustine Speedway. Fultz would spit his schedule the following year driving in the Southeast Series, winning two poles and a best finish of third at Louisville Motor Speedway in just ten starts, and in the ASA National Tour, running the first ten races on the schedule with a top-10 finish at Tri-County Motor Speedway with a seventh place finish.

Fultz would solely focus on the Southeast Series for the next two seasons, finishing 5th in the points in 1999, an 2nd behind Billy Bigley in 2000. It was in the latter year that Fultz would make his ARCA debut, running both Charlotte races with a best finish of 13th in his first start. For 2001, he would finish third in the Southeast Series standings with four wins and two poles. Fultz also made his NASCAR Busch Series debut at North Carolina Speedway driving the No. 86 Chevrolet for Jimmy Craig, finishing 39th due to an engine problem. He would also attempt to make his Winston Cup Series at Charlotte for the Coca-Cola 600 driving for Gene DeHart and Mike Clark, ultimately failing to qualify.

In 2002, Fultz would win his first Southeast Series title with three wins at Myrtle Beach, Nashville and Memphis. He would also win his first ARCA race that year at Charlotte, as well as making three Busch Series races that year with a best finish of 26th at Nashville. Although Fultz would win the most races in the Southeast season in 2003, he would ultimately finish second in the standings behind Charlie Bradberry. He would run four races in the ARCA Series, three races in the Busch Series, and would attempt two Winston Cup races, failing to qualify at both Atlanta and Charlotte.

Fultz would win the Southeast championship again in 2004 ahead of J. R. Norris with five wins and two poles. He would also one again attempt to make his debut in the now Nextel Cup Series at Charlotte for the Coca-Cola 600, driving the No. 78 Ford for Harrah Racing, failing to qualify for the event. In 2005, he would win the Southeast championship again ahead of Jason Hogan with four wins. He would run one more race in the series the following year before the series folded at the end of the year. He also ran in the Hooters Pro Cup Series that year, running in 14 races with a pole at Lakeland and a best finish of fifth at Myrtle Beach.

Since the folding of the Southeast Series, he would compete sporadically in various late-model events like the Snowball Derby, the Winchester 400 and in various other late-model and modified series. He also acts as the driver and owner of his late-model team Jeff Fultz Racing, which has fielded drivers such as Jordan Anderson, Kodie Conner, and William Byron.

Fultz has recently competed in the JEGS/CRA All-Stars Tour.

Motorsports career results

NASCAR
(key) (Bold – Pole position awarded by qualifying time. Italics – Pole position earned by points standings or practice time. * – Most laps led.)

Nextel Cup Series

Busch Series

ARCA Re/Max Series
(key) (Bold – Pole position awarded by qualifying time. Italics – Pole position earned by points standings or practice time. * – Most laps led.)

References

Living people
1968 births
NASCAR drivers